Federation droid, Federation Droids, or variation, may refer to:

 Battle droid (Star Wars), droids of the Galactic Trade Federation
 Soong-type android, sometimes called "droid", found in the United Federation of Planets, created by Noonien Soong
 Data (Star Trek), the most prominent example
 List of Star Trek characters, other noted examples, including Juliana Soong, Lal, B4 and Lore

See also
 Federation (disambiguation)
 Droid (disambiguation)
 Android (disambiguation)